Ortmayer is a surname. Notable people with the surname include:

Constance Ortmayer (1902–1988), American artist
Roland Ortmayer (1917–2008), American football player and coach
Steve Ortmayer (1944–2021), American football player, coach, and executive
Travis Ortmayer (born 1981), American strongman athlete